Kevin Yates (born 6 November 1972 in Medicine Hat, Alberta, Canada) is an English rugby union player who plays at Prop for Nice in the French Fédérale 1.

Yates professional career began at Bath. He was a member of the side that won the 1995/96 Zurich Premiership. He also played in the 1998 Heineken Cup Semi-final against Pau, but did not feature in the final against CA Brive. Yates made his England debut on the 1997 tour of Argentina.

Yates received a 6-month ban he received for biting the ear of London Scottish flanker Simon Fenn on 10 January 1998 whilst playing for Bath. He subsequently moved to play for the Super 12 side Wellington Hurricanes, making his debut against the Sharks in the opening round of the 2000 Super 12.

Yates also helped the Wellington Lions win the 2000 National Provincial Championship. He joined Sale Sharks in 2001, winning the 2001–02 European Challenge Cup.

Yates joined Saracens in 2004. In 2007 he was called up for England's tour of South Africa alongside Saracens teammates Matt Cairns and Andy Farrell.

Due to Nick Wood being injured, Yates started against South Africa, a record period of time between caps. On this tour he was capped twice; his first senior England caps for 10 years.

At the end of the 2007–08 season he moved to Nice, where he plays alongside Dan Luger and Will Johnson.

References

External links
 Official RNCA page
 Hurricanes profile

1972 births
Living people
English rugby union players
Canadian rugby union players
Sportspeople from Alberta
Sportspeople from Medicine Hat
Bath Rugby players
Sale Sharks players
Saracens F.C. players
Hurricanes (rugby union) players
England international rugby union players
Rugby union props
English people of Canadian descent
Wellington rugby union players
Rugby Nice Côte d'Azur players